Spinanapis is a genus of Australian araneomorph spiders in the family Anapidae, first described by Norman I. Platnick & Raymond Robert Forster in 1989.

Species
 it contains nine species:
Spinanapis darlingtoni (Forster, 1959) – Australia (Queensland)
Spinanapis frere Platnick & Forster, 1989 – Australia (Queensland)
Spinanapis julatten Platnick & Forster, 1989 – Australia (Queensland)
Spinanapis ker Platnick & Forster, 1989 – Australia (Queensland)
Spinanapis lewis Platnick & Forster, 1989 – Australia (Queensland)
Spinanapis monteithi Platnick & Forster, 1989 – Australia (Queensland)
Spinanapis thompsoni Platnick & Forster, 1989 – Australia (Queensland)
Spinanapis thornton Platnick & Forster, 1989 – Australia (Queensland)
Spinanapis yeatesi Platnick & Forster, 1989 – Australia (Queensland)

References

Anapidae
Araneomorphae genera
Spiders of Australia
Taxa named by Raymond Robert Forster